Tetracha acutipennis is a species of tiger beetle that was described by Dejean in 1825.

References

Cicindelidae
Beetles described in 1825